Litoral is a four-part 2008 Chilean TV miniseries written and directed by Raúl Ruiz. Originally subtitled "Tales of the Sea", it is thematically similar to the director's film Three Crowns of the Sailor (1983) and is the second of the oneiric folklore-themed miniseries' he made for TVN, following on from La Recta Provincia (2007).

Cast

 Santiago Meneghello
 Daniel Kiblisky
 Francisca Walker
 Héctor Aguilar
 Ignacio Agüero
 Jorge Becker
 Bélgica Castro
 Roberto Cobian
 Marcial Edwards
 Carlos Flores del Pino
 Cristián Gajardo
 Pablo Krögh
 Sandro Larenas
 Francisco Medina
 Hugo Medina
 Juan Pablo Miranda
 Mario Montilles
 Eugenio Morales
 Valentina Muhr
 Javiera Parra
 Hernán Vallejo
 Pedro Vicuña

References

External links
 

Chilean television miniseries
2000s Chilean television series
Films directed by Raúl Ruiz
2008 films
2008 Chilean television series debuts
2008 Chilean television series endings